Asthenotoma is a genus of sea snails, marine gastropod mollusks in the family Borsoniidae.

Description
This genus, almost entirely represented by extinct species, is of slender form and elevated, evenly and gradually acuminate spire, conspicuous development of the spiral lyrae and short aperture. It should evidently be considered especially with Trypanotoma and allies, but it is somewhat of an annectant form, as the American species at least have true ribbing on the nepionic whorls which becomes completely lost on the larger volutions of the shell. It is therefore one of those puzzling exceptions which render an arrangement of the genera in a dichotomous table so difficult and unsatisfactory. The embryo in the type, Pleurotoma basteroti Desm., of the European Miocene, is  said by Cossmann to be paucispiral, but the drawing shows a multispiral protoconch. This is, however, a matter of minor importance. The
anal sinus is broad, sometimes very feeble and always median in position on the spire whorls though not identified with any particular one or more of the subequal and rather coarse flat spirals. The beak has no external oblique tumidity. There can be but little doubt, in view of geographical variations and wide distribution of this genus, that Endiatoma, of Cossmann, should be regarded as a synonym or as constituting a slightly differentiated section of Asthenotoma.

Species
Species within the genus Asthenotoma include:
 † Asthenotoma angusta Lozouet, 2017
 † Asthenotoma bipunctula (S. V. Wood, 1848) 
 † Asthenotoma colus (Dujardin, 1837) 
 † Asthenotoma conulus (Grateloup, 1845) 
 † Asthenotoma crenulata Gougerot, 1966 
 † Asthenotoma falunica Peyrot, 1938 
 † Asthenotoma festiva (Hörnes, 1854) 
 † Asthenotoma juvenilis Lozouet, 2015 
 † Asthenotoma lamothei (Dautzenberg, 1910)
 † Asthenotoma lanceolata Ceulemans, Van Dingenen & Landau, 2018 
 † Asthenotoma ligata (Defrance, 1826) 
 † Asthenotoma meneghinii (Mayer, 1868) 
 † Asthenotoma newtoni de Boury, 1899 
 † Asthenotoma ornata (Defrance, 1826) 
 † Asthenotoma pannus (Basterot, 1825) 
 † Asthenotoma praepannus Lozouet, 2017 
 † Asthenotoma pupa (Edwards, 1861) 
 Asthenotoma texta (Thiele, 1925) (original combination: Turris (Hemipleurotoma) texta)
 † Asthenotoma tuberculata (Pusch, 1837) 
 † Asthenotoma vulcani Lozouet, 2017 
Taxon inquirendum
 Oligotoma sirpata Jousseaume, 1891
Synonyms
 Subgenus Asthenotoma (Drilliola) Locard, 1897: synonym of Drilliola Locard, 1897
 Asthenotoma (Drilliola) emendata (Monterosato, 1872): synonym of Drilliola emendata (Monterosato, 1872)
 Asthenotoma cicatrigula Hedley, 1922: synonym of Tomopleura cicatrigula (Hedley, 1922)
 Asthenotoma eva (Thiele, 1925): synonym of Maoritomella eva (Thiele, 1925)
  †Asthenotoma exbasteroti Peyrot, 1931: synonym of  † Drilliola basteroti (Des Moulins, 1842)
 Asthenotoma komakimonos Otuka, 1935: synonym of Pulsarella komakimonos (Otuka, 1935)
 † Asthenotoma obesa Peyrot, 1931: synonym of  † Drilliola obesa (Peyrot, 1931)(original combination)
 Asthenotoma spiralis (E. A. Smith, 1872): synonym of Tomopleura spiralissima Gofas & Rolán, 2009
 Asthenotoma subtilinea Hedley, 1918: synonym of Tomopleura subtilinea (Hedley, 1918)
 † Asthenotoma tricarinata Peyrot, 1931: synonym of  † Boettgeriola tricarinata (Peyrot, 1931) (original combination)
 Asthenotoma vertebrata (E. A. Smith, 1875): synonym of Tomopleura vertebrata (E. A. Smith, 1875)

References

External links
 Harris G. F. & Burrows H. W. (1891). The Eocene and Oligocene beds of the Paris basin. Geologists' Association, London 129 pp.: page(s): 113
 Bellardi L. (1875). Novae pleurotomidarum Pedimonti et Liguriae fossilium: dispositionis prodromus. Bullettino della Società Malacologica Italiana. 1: 16-24
  Bouchet, P.; Kantor, Y. I.; Sysoev, A.; Puillandre, N. (2011). A new operational classification of the Conoidea. Journal of Molluscan Studies. 77, 273-308
 MNHN, Paris: Asthenotoma crenulata